John Sutton (22 October 1908 – 10 July 1963) was a British actor with a prolific career in Hollywood of more than 30 years.

Personal life
Sutton was born in Rawalpindi, India (now Rawalpindi, Punjab, Pakistan). He was the son of Lt. Colonel Arthur Congdon (1861-1924) of the Royal Munster Fusiliers and his wife Ann Bell Sutton Moxley Congdon. Before moving to Hollywood as an actor, he was a tea planter in Assam, India, and, failing that, he farmed for a while in South Africa. Upon being naturalized as a U.S. citizen while serving in the U.S. Navy in 1943, he legally changed his name to John Sutton.

Sutton was married at least three times. In 1933, he married wealthy socialite Charlotte Biddle Barrett. In the 1940 federal census, the household included his wife Charlotte and her daughter from a previous marriage. In October 1946, he divorced his high society wife and married Roberta Fidler, former wife of newspaper columnist and radio commentator Jimmie Fidler; this rather stormy second marriage ended in divorce in 1955. He married dancer Anita Rodney-Eden in 1957, but he received an annulment in 1960, when it was shown that she was still legally the ninth wife of oft-married (13 marriages to 11 women) Tommy Manville.
He died suddenly of a heart attack on 10 July 1963.

Filmography

The House of a Thousand Candles (1936) as Young Man (uncredited)
Federal Agent (1936) as Elevator Operator (uncredited)
The Princess Comes Across (1936) as Ship's Passenger at Baggage Check / At Concert (uncredited)
The Last of the Mohicans (1936) as British officer, Fort Henry (uncredited)
Bulldog Drummond Comes Back (1937) as Sanger
Bulldog Drummond's Revenge (1937) as Jennings, Nielson's Secretary
The Buccaneer (1938) as British Officer Before Battle (uncredited)
Mad About Music (1938) as Photographer (uncredited)
Bulldog Drummond's Peril (1938) as Doctor (uncredited)
Fools for Scandal (1938) as Bruce Devon (uncredited)
Four Men and a Prayer (1938) as Capt. Drake
The Adventures of Robin Hood (1938) as Richard's Knight (uncredited)
Kidnapped (1938) as English Officer (uncredited)
Blond Cheat (1938) as Fred Percy
Booloo (1938) as Ferguson
The Affairs of Annabel (1938) as Man at Newsstand (uncredited)
Arrest Bulldog Drummond (1939) as Inspector Tredennis (uncredited)
The Dawn Patrol (1938) as Adjutant (uncredited)
Zaza (1939) as Dandy (uncredited)
I'm from Missouri (1939) as Subaltern (uncredited)
Sons of Liberty (1939, Short) as Hessian Courier (uncredited)
Susannah of the Mounties (1939) as Corporal Piggott
Bulldog Drummond's Bride (1939) as Inspector Tredennis
The Private Lives of Elizabeth and Essex (1939) as Capt. Armand of the Queen's Guard (uncredited)
Tower of London (1939) as John Wyatt
Charlie McCarthy, Detective (1939) as Bill Banning
The Invisible Man Returns (1940) as Doctor Frank Griffin
Sandy Is a Lady (1940) (uncredited)
I Can't Give You Anything But Love, Baby (1940) as Boston
South to Karanga (1940) as David Wallace
The Sea Hawk (1940) as Captain of the Guard (uncredited)
Murder Over New York (1940) as Richard Jeffery
Hudson's Bay (1941) as Lord Edward Crewe
A Very Young Lady (1941) as Dr. Franklin Meredith
A Yank in the R.A.F. (1941) as Wing Commander Morley
Moon Over Her Shoulder (1941) as Dr. Phillip Rossiter
My Gal Sal (1942) as Fred Haviland
Ten Gentlemen from West Point (1942) as Howard Shelton
Thunder Birds (1942) as Peter Stackhouse
Tonight We Raid Calais (1943) as Geoffrey Carter
Jane Eyre (1943) as Dr. Rivers
The Hour Before the Dawn (1944) as Roger Hetherton
Claudia and David (1946) as Phil Dexter
Captain from Castile (1947) as Diego De Silva
Adventures of Casanova (1948) as Count de Brissac
The Counterfeiters (1948) as Jeff MacAllister
Mickey (1948) as Ted Whitney
The Three Musketeers (1948) as The Duke of Buckingham
The Fan (1949) as Cecil Graham
Bride of Vengeance (1949) as Prince Bisceglie
Bagdad (1949) as Raizul
The Second Woman (1950) as Keith Ferris
The Second Face (1950) as Jerry Allison
Payment on Demand (1951) as Anthony Tunliffe
David and Bathsheba (1951) as Ira
Fireside Theatre (1951, TV Series)
5 Fingers (1952) as Narrator (voice, uncredited)
Thief of Damascus (1952) as Khalid
Lady in the Iron Mask (1952) as Duke de Valdac
The Schaefer Century Theatre (1952, TV Series)
Captain Pirate (1952) as Capt. Hilary Evans
The Golden Hawk (1952) as Captain Luis del Toro
My Cousin Rachel (1952) as Ambrose Ashley
Sangaree (1953) as Harvey Bristol
East of Sumatra (1953) as Daniel Catlin
Lux Video Theatre (1954, TV Series) as Evan
Private Secretary (1954, TV Series) as King Price
General Electric Theater (1954–1955, TV Series) as Ted Preston / Tom Wickers
Four Star Playhouse (1956, TV Series) as Rene Champion
Playwrights '56 (1956, TV Series) as Mr. Black
Studio 57 (1956, TV Series) as Mark Brinker
The Count of Monte Cristo (1956, TV Series) as De Villefort
Death of a Scoundrel (1956) as The Actor as 'Tom' in Stage Play
The Amazon Trader (1956) as The Amazon Trader 
Tales of the 77th Bengal Lancers (1956, TV Series)
Schlitz Playhouse of Stars (1958, TV Series)
The United States Steel Hour (1958, TV Series) as Colonel Resnor
Tumulto de Paixões (1958) as John Morgan
The Californians (1958, TV Series) as Sam Crawford
Behind Closed Doors (1958–1959, TV Series) as Harry Shaw
Tombstone Territory (1959, TV Series) as David Armbruster
Return of the Fly (1959) as Insp. Beecham
The Bat (1959) as Warner, the chauffeur
Beloved Infidel (1959) as Lord Donegall
The Man From Blackhawk (1959, TV Series) as Bart Mason
Bat Masterson (1959, TV Series) as Orrin Thackeray / Andrew Stafford
77 Sunset Strip (1959, TV Series) as Ralph Anderson
Disneyland (1959–1960, The Swamp Fox TV Series) as Colonel Banastre Tarleton
The Rebel (1960, TV Series) as C. Spencer Scott—The Earl of Durango / Gold Seeker
Men into Space (1959–1960, TV Series) as Air Vice Marshal Malcolm Terry
The Aquanauts (1960, TV Series) as Tony Randolph
The Case of the Dangerous Robin (1960, TV Series)
Stagecoach West (1961, TV Series) as Robert Allison / Rexford Jasper
The Canadians (1961) as Superintendent Walker
Checkmate (1961, TV Series) as George Parker
The Brothers Brannagan (1961, TV Series) as John Elliot
Perry Mason (1961, TV Series) as Clifton Barlow
Rawhide (1961, TV Series) as Lord Ashton
Shadow of Fear (1963) as Peter Halliday 
Of Human Bondage (1964) as Kingsford (uncredited) (final film role)

References

External links 

 
 
 

1908 births
1963 deaths
British male film actors
20th-century British male actors
Male actors from Rawalpindi
British emigrants to the United States
British people in colonial India